Stefan Inglot (b. June 10, 1902 in Albigowa near Łańcut, d. January 10, 1994 in Wrocław, Poland) was a Polish historian and a cooperative activist.

He graduated from the Lwów University. At the same university he gained PhD in 1926 and passed his habilitation in history in 1932. He was professor on the Lwów University since 1939. During the German occupation of Poland in World War II he became principal of the Underground University of Lwów, accidentally jailed.

In 1946 he was appointed professor at the Wrocław University and since 1991 member of the Polish Academy of Skills (PAU).

Works
 Kolonizacja wewnętrzna a napływ Niemców od XVI do XVIII w. (1945)
 Udział chłopów w obronie Polski. Zarys historyczny (1946)
 Historia chlopów polskich (t. 1-2 1970-72)

Footnotes

1902 births
1994 deaths
Polish resistance members of World War II
20th-century Polish historians
Polish male non-fiction writers
Polish people of the Polish–Ukrainian War
Children in war
Academic staff of the University of Lviv
People from Łańcut County